Scott Mabon Hoch (born November 24, 1955) is an American professional golfer, who represented his country in the Ryder Cup in 1997 and 2002.

Early life and amateur career
Hoch was born in Raleigh, North Carolina. While attending Needham B. Broughton High School, he won the 1973 NCHSAA Men's Golf State Championship. He was a member of the golf team at Wake Forest University before graduating in 1978. In 1978 Hoch reached the final of the U.S. Amateur, losing 5 & 4 to John Cook. He played on the winning U.S. team in the 1978 Eisenhower Trophy and the 1979 Walker Cup. His achievements in 1978 led to an invitation to the 1979 Masters Tournament where he tied for 34th place, the second amateur behind Bobby Clampett. He turned professional in 1979 after competing in the U.S. Amateur.

Professional career
Hoch has won several tournaments, including the Western Open, the Ford Championship at Doral, the Heineken Dutch Open and the Bob Hope Chrysler Classic. He also won the Vardon Trophy for lowest scoring average in 1986. He has featured in the top 20 of the Official World Golf Ranking.

Hoch is widely known for missing a two-foot-long putt that would have won the 1989 Masters Tournament on the first playoff hole, which he lost to Nick Faldo on the next hole. At the 1987 PGA Championship, Hoch three-putted the 18th hole on Sunday from inside of ten feet. A two-putt would have secured a playoff spot for him.

Hoch is also well known for his infamous quote regarding playing in The Open Championship at the "home of golf" at St Andrews. Hoch referred to this course, considered hallowed ground by most golfers around the world, as "the worst piece of mess" he had ever seen. Partly due to his Open Championship criticism Hoch has been characterized as an "ugly American." However he has played extensively abroad and done fairly well, with three victories on the Japan Golf Tour, a victory at European Tour's 1995 Dutch Open, and multiple victories on the Korean Tour. He also has runner-up finishes at the 1987 Dunlop Phoenix Tournament, 1994 Casio World Open on the Japan Golf Tour, 1995 New Zealand Open on the Australasian Tour, and the 1996 Dutch Open.

Hoch is the rare American golfer who has criticized the Ryder Cup. Before his participation in the 2002 event he described the Ryder Cup as "overrated" and thought that the competition had gotten too "inflammatory."

In 1982, Hoch said that he feared he was going to die after an intruder came into his hotel room in Tucson, Arizona, held him and his wife, Sally, at gunpoint, and tied them up for an hour.

In 1989, Hoch said that he was "really hurt" after being named "Least Popular Golfer" in a poll of Tour players conducted by the Dallas Times Herald.

In May 2007, Hoch won his first Champions Tour event, the FedEx Kinko's Classic. In February 2008, he won his second and third events in consecutive weeks.

In April 2019, Hoch won at the age of 63 the Bass Pro Shops Legends of Golf with Tom Pernice Jr. This first win in 11 years made him the oldest winner on the Champions Tour. Hoch's record held until October 2021, when Bernhard Langer broke it at the Dominion Energy Charity Classic.

Amateur wins
1977 Northeast Amateur

Professional wins (23)

PGA Tour wins (11)

*Note: The 1982 USF&G Classic was shortened to 54 holes due to weather.

PGA Tour playoff record (2–2)

European Tour wins (1)

European Tour playoff record (0–1)

Japan Golf Tour wins (3)

Japan Golf Tour playoff record (0–1)

Korean wins (2)
1990 Korea Open
1991 Korea Open

Other wins (2)

Other playoff record (0–2)

PGA Tour Champions wins (4)

PGA Tour Champions playoff record (1–1)

Results in major championships

WD = Withdrew
CUT = missed the half-way cut
"T" indicates a tie for a place

Summary

Most consecutive cuts made – 10 (1983 Masters – 1987 PGA)
Longest streak of top-10s – 2 (4 times)

Results in The Players Championship

CUT = missed the halfway cut
WD = withdrew
"T" indicates a tie for a place

Results in World Golf Championships

1Cancelled due to 9/11

QF, R16, R32, R64 = Round in which player lost in match play
"T" = Tied
NT = No tournament

U.S. national team appearances
Amateur
Eisenhower Trophy: 1978 (winners)
Walker Cup: 1979 (winners)

Professional
Presidents Cup: 1994 (winners), 1996 (winners), 1998
Ryder Cup: 1997, 2002
UBS Cup: 2001 (winners), 2002 (winners), 2003 (tie), 2004 (winners)

See also 

 Fall 1979 PGA Tour Qualifying School graduates

References

External links

American male golfers
Wake Forest Demon Deacons men's golfers
PGA Tour golfers
PGA Tour Champions golfers
Ryder Cup competitors for the United States
Golfers from Raleigh, North Carolina
Golfers from Orlando, Florida
Needham B. Broughton High School alumni
1955 births
Living people